Sir Robert Rochester KG (ca. 1494 – 28 November 1557) was an English Catholic and Comptroller of the Household and a member of the Privy Council in the reign of Mary I.

Family
Rochester's family were 'minor Essex gentry' associated with the Earls of Oxford. According to Ross, Robert Rochester, esquire, was Comptroller of the Household to John de Vere, 13th Earl of Oxford, at a fee of £10 per year, from about 1495 until his death in 1508.

Robert Rochester was born at Terling, Essex, the third son of John Rochester and Grisold Writtle, daughter of Walter Writtle of Bobbingworth. Grisold Writtle's sister, Eleanor, married James Walsingham, and was the mother of Edmund Walsingham, Lieutenant of the Tower of London.

Rochester's younger brother, Blessed John Rochester, was a Carthusian priest and martyr who was executed in York in May 1537, and beatified in 1888.

Career
According to Hughes, by 1542 Rochester had been appointed receiver to John de Vere, 16th Earl of Oxford, and was also appointed bailiff of the Earl's manor of Lavenham in Suffolk. By 1551, Rochester had been appointed Comptroller of the Household to Mary Tudor, Henry VIII's elder daughter by Catherine of Aragon.  In that year, the Privy Council ordered Rochester to stop any priest from saying mass in the Princess's household; Rochester refused, and was imprisoned in the Tower (according to the National Archives he was imprisoned in the Fleet), and replaced as Comptroller by Sir Anthony Wingfield. The next year, he was released to retire due to his health. He was soon allowed to resume his post as Comptroller.

When the Princess assumed the throne as Mary I, she rewarded Rochester for his faithful service, making him Chancellor of the Duchy of Lancaster and appointing him to the inner circle of the Privy Council.  He served as a Member of Parliament for Essex from 1553 to 1555.

Death
Rochester died, ummarried, on 28 November 1557. William Rochester, Sir Robert's older brother received a third of his lands. 

Robert Rochester was buried on 4 December at the Charterhouse at Sheen, the house reconstituted by the remnant of the English Carthusians under Dom Maurice Chauncy. He was succeeded in his post as Chancellor of the Duchy of Lancaster by his nephew, Sir Edward Waldegrave (died 1 September 1561), son of John Waldegrave (died 1543) and Rochester's sister Lora (died c. 1545).

Notes

References

External links

Attribution

1490s births
1557 deaths
People from Terling
Chancellors of the Duchy of Lancaster
Garter Knights appointed by Mary I
15th-century English people
15th-century Roman Catholics
16th-century Roman Catholics
English Roman Catholics
English MPs 1553 (Mary I)
English MPs 1554
English MPs 1554–1555
English MPs 1555